Mark Grosvenor McNeill Shelford is a British Conservative politician and former lieutenant colonel in the British Army, who has served as the Avon and Somerset Police and Crime Commissioner since 2021.

Biography 
Shelford served in the British Army between 1981 and 2013, eventually retiring at the rank of lieutenant colonel. This included service in the Gulf War as the aide-de-camp to Brigadier Patrick Cordingley.

Shelford was elected to Bath and North East Somerset Council in the 2015 election. He held this position until 2019, where he was defeated by the Liberal Democrat candidate. He is also a member of the Avon and Somerset Police and Crime Panel, and the Avon Fire Authority.

Police and Crime Commissioner 
Shelford was elected on the second round of voting in the 2021 election.

References

External links

Police and crime commissioners in England
Living people
Conservative Party police and crime commissioners
Conservative Party (UK) councillors
Councillors in Somerset
Year of birth missing (living people)